Radiolites is a genus  of rudists in the family Radiolitidae.

Fossil record
These rudists lived in the Cretaceous from the upper Albian to the upper Maastrichtian ages (age range: 112.6 to 66.043 million years ago). The fossils were found in Albania, Austria, Bulgaria, Croatia, Cuba, the Czech Republic, Egypt, France, Germany, Greece, Hungary, Italy, Jamaica, Mexico, Oman, Pakistan, Peru, Portugal, Romania, Serbia and Montenegro, Slovenia, Spain, Switzerland, Tunisia, Turkey, Turkmenistan and United States.

Species
Species within this genus include:
 † Radiolites acutocostata Adkins 1930
 † Radiolites angeoides (Delapeirouse)
 † Radiolites carsicus Caffau et al. 1995
 † Radiolites dario Catullo 1834
 † Radiolites macroplicatus Whitfield 1987
 † Radiolites praegalloprovincialis Toucas 1908
 † Radiolites spongicola Astre 1954

References

External links

 
Molluscs described in 1801
Fossils of Serbia
Prehistoric bivalve genera